Revaz Valerianovic Gamkrelidze (ISO 9984: Revaz Valeris je Gamqrelije; born February 4, 1927) is a Georgian and Soviet mathematician known for his work in optimal control theory
and related fields. Gamkrelidze is a member of the Georgian Academy of Sciences and a member of the Russian Academy of Sciences.  He is the founding editor of Encyclopaedia of Mathematical Sciences.

Revaz Gamkrelidze is the brother of the linguist Tamaz Gamkrelidze.

Life
After secondary school, Gamkrelidze attended Tbilisi State University. In his sophomore year, he went to Moscow to study at the mechanics and mathematics faculty of the Moscow State University where he became a student of Pontryagin.

Work
At Moscow State University he initially worked in the fields of algebraic geometry and topology and derived what is now known as Gamkrelidze's formula
. In 1954 he began his work on optimal control. He wrote Mathematical Theory of Optimal Processes with Pontryagin, Boltyanskii and Mishchenko. This work was awarded the State Lenin Prize for Science and Technology in 1962. Gamkrelidze is the founding editor of Encyclopedia of Mathematical Sciences.

Books
 MR 0166037

 MR 0686792

Notes

References

External links
 
 Revaz Gamkrelidze at  Mathnet.ru
 Revaz Gamkrelidze's CV at the Georgian Academy of Sciences website

1927 births
Living people
20th-century mathematicians from Georgia (country)
Soviet mathematicians
Lenin Prize winners
Tbilisi State University alumni
Moscow State University alumni
People from Kutaisi